Trosia flavida is a moth of the Megalopygidae family. It was described by Paul Dognin in 1911.

References

External links
 https://www.inaturalist.org/observations/67967935

Moths described in 1911
Megalopygidae